Cătălin Burlacu (born July 7, 1977) is a Romanian professional basketball player for SCM U Craiova in the Romanian League.

References

1977 births
Living people
Centers (basketball)
Romanian men's basketball players
BC Kalev/Cramo players
Sportspeople from Iași
Romanian expatriate basketball people in Estonia
Romanian expatriate basketball people in Italy
Romanian expatriate basketball people in Germany